
Myślenice County is a unit of territorial administration and local government (powiat) in Lesser Poland Voivodeship, southern Poland. It came into being on January 1, 1999, as a result of the Polish local government reforms passed in 1998.

As of 2006 its total population is 116,793, out of which the population of Myślenice is 18,070, that of Sułkowice is 6,305, that of Dobczyce is 6,028, and the rural population is 86,390.

Neighbouring counties
Myślenice County is bordered by Kraków County and Wieliczka County to the north, Bochnia County and Limanowa County to the east, Nowy Targ County to the south, and Sucha County and Wadowice County to the west.

Administrative division
The county is subdivided into nine gminas (three urban-rural and six rural). These are listed in the following table, in descending order of population.

References
Polish official population figures 2006

 
Land counties of Lesser Poland Voivodeship